Len Roberts (4 July 1880 – 1 January 1949) was an Australian rules footballer who played with St Kilda in the Victorian Football League (VFL).

Family
The son of William Roberts, and Martha Louisa Roberts, née Ball, Leonard Roberts was born in St Kilda, Victoria on 4 July 1880.

He married Florence Hilda Camm (1884-1965) in 1936.

Football
In his only match for the St Kilda First XVIII, he played at centre half-back, in the match against Collingwood, at Victoria Park, on 28 July 1906.

Death
He died (suddenly) at his residence in Burwood, Victoria on 1 January 1949.

Footnotes

References
 Holmesby, Russell & Main, Jim (2014). The Encyclopedia of AFL Footballers: every AFL/VFL player since 1897 (10th edition). Seaford, Victoria: BAS Publishing. p. 755.

External links 

1880 births
1949 deaths
Australian rules footballers from Melbourne
St Kilda Football Club players
People from St Kilda, Victoria